Mitja Schäfer (born 27 February 1980) is a German footballer who played in the 2. Bundesliga for LR Ahlen and Erzgebirge Aue.

External links

1980 births
Living people
German footballers
1. FC Köln II players
FC Erzgebirge Aue players
Rot Weiss Ahlen players
Rot-Weiss Essen players
Wuppertaler SV players
SC Fortuna Köln players
2. Bundesliga players
3. Liga players
Footballers from Cologne
Association football central defenders